Khin Waing Kyi (born 9 February 1947) is a Burmese politician who served as an MP in the House of Nationalities for Yangon Region № 1 constituency from 2011 to 2016.

She is one of the most hardcore nationalist politicians and supporters of the controversial Patriotic Association of Myanmar. In 2016, she lobbied against the constitutional amendment that could allow Aung San Suu Kyi to become President of Myanmar.

Early life and career
Khin Waing Kyi was born in Wetlet Township, British Burma to Kyaw Hlaing and Kyi Thein. She attended Pale Ngwe Yaung School and No.4 Women's High School in Mandalay. She enrolled at the Mandalay Arts and Science University but dropped out in her second year.

She worked as a teacher, and later worked as a managing director of Human Resources Co., Ltd. and D Sliver Palace Co., Ltd.

Political career

Political movements
She worked as a youth organization committee member of then ruling Burmese Socialist Programme Party in Madaya Township, Mandalay Division. She later served as a joint-secretary general of trade unions in the Jute Enterprise under the Ministry of Industry No.1 during 1988 uprisings. Then she was forced to retire when the State Law and Order Restoration Council seized power in the same year.

She served as vice chair of the Rangoon Division party branch, and as a central executive committee member of the Union of Myanmar Federation of National Politics in 2008-09.

Parliamentary career
Khin Waing Kyi is a senior party member of the National Democratic Force. She submitted a proposal to introduce proportional representation. She was close to Ma Ba Tha and proved to be one of the most hardcore nationalist voices in the democratic contingent in Parliament. At the Amyotha Hluttaw, she discussed about managing the plastic items which should be systematically discarded with rules and regulations by the government.

She also introduced a proposal to switch to proportional representation system from the first-past-the-post (FPTP) system. She said a “The upper house concluded – based on debate over to bring together members of the parliamentary Bill Commission with representatives of the Union Election Commission to study proportional representation and discuss approaches which could be adopted in this new system".

In 2015 election, she ran for House of Representatives seat from the Meiktila Township constituency, but lost to Maung Thin, a Union Solidarity and Development Party candidate.

Public image
In 2013, Khin Waing Kyi submitted the proposal for the religious conversion and population-control bills to parliament, which were introduced by the controversial monk, Ashin Wirathu. Women’s rights advocates and several of ethnic and religious minorities were concerned that the bills would deal a blow to religious freedom, undermine women’s ability to make independent choices about their faith, partner and family, and exacerbate existing interfaith tensions between Muslim and Buddhist communities.

References

External links 

Amyotha Hluttaw Parliament : Khin Waing Kyi's MP Profile

Members of the House of Nationalities
1947 births
Living people
21st-century Burmese women politicians
21st-century Burmese politicians
People from Sagaing Region